Michael Alexander Arabian (c.1876 – 1957) was a playwright and novelist of the early 20th century. He was the author of Yeraz (1921) and Joykin (1926).

Arabian was born in Crete and was of Armenian ancestry. He died in London in 1957.

References

External links
Review of Joykin in The New York Times, 27 March 1927.
Portraits of Michael Arabian by Howard Coster at the National Portrait Gallery (London).

20th-century British novelists
British dramatists and playwrights
1957 deaths
British male novelists
British male dramatists and playwrights
20th-century British male writers
20th-century British writers
Year of birth uncertain